The 1931–32 Northern Football League season was the 39th in the history of the Northern Football League, a football competition in Northern England.

Clubs

The league featured 12 clubs which competed in the last season, along with two new clubs:
 Evenwood Town
 Harrogate, joined from the Yorkshire League

League table

References

1931-32
4